Radbruch is a municipality in the district of Lüneburg, in Lower Saxony, Germany.

References

Lüneburg (district)